Melaleuca pachyphylla, commonly known as wallum bottlebrush, is a plant in the myrtle family Myrtaceae, and is endemic to near-coastal regions of New South Wales and Queensland in Australia. (Some Australian state herbaria use the name Callistemon pachyphyllus, which is still widely used in the literature). It is a medium-sized shrub with a straggling habit and red, or sometimes greenish, bottlebrush flowers in summer.

Description
There is a distinct mid-vein and 11–22 side veins.

The flowers are usually crimson but sometimes greenish-yellow. They are arranged in spikes on the ends of branches that continue to grow after flowering and also on the sides of the branches.

Taxonomy and naming
Melaleuca pachyphylla was first formally described in 2006 by Lyndley Craven in Novon. The specific epithet (pachyphylla) is from the Greek words pakhús meaning “thick” and phýllon meaning “leaf” in reference to the thick leaves of this species.

Callistemon pachyphyllus is regarded as a synonym of Melaleuca pachyphylla by the Royal Botanic Gardens, Kew.

Distribution and habitat
Melaleuca pachyphylla occurs in coastal areas from Port Stephens in New South Wales to Hervey Bay in Queensland. It grows in moist ground in wallum.

Conservation
Melaleuca pachyphylla is sometimes cultivated as Callistemon pachyphyllus. It is a hardy plant that grows well in poorly drained soil in full sun.

References

pachyphylla
Flora of New South Wales
Flora of Queensland
Plants described in 2006
Taxa named by Edwin Cheel